A Believing People: Literature of the Latter-day Saints, edited by Richard H. Cracroft and Neal E. Lambert, and published in 1974, was "the first significant anthology of the literature of the Latter-day Saints" and began the establishment of the field of Mormon literature as a legitimate discipline, and remains, according to A Motley Vision in 2012, " the only comprehensive Mormon Literature anthology ever published." Cracroft and Lambert released an anthology with a more modern focus, 22 Young Mormon Writers, the following year.

Included authors
The collection includes works of many sorts (letters, poetry, sermons, etc.), mostly from LDS authors, but also some by those friendly to the Mormons (e.g. Thomas L. Kane) or with early-life connections (e.g. Ina Coolbrith) or similarly tangential relationships. Authors are listed alphabetically. Works without a listed author are not reflected in this list.

History 
Lucy Mack Smith
Joseph Smith Jr.
B. H. Roberts
Thomas L. Kane
Leonard J. Arrington
James E. Talmage

Biography and Autobiography 
Parley P. Pratt
John Taylor
Daniel W. Jones
S. A. Kenner
Florence A. Merriam Bailey
Karl G. Maeser
Juanita Brooks

Letters 
Joseph Smith Jr.
Brigham Young
Ursulia B. Hascall
Irene Hascall Pomeroy
Ellen Spencer Clawson

Journals and Diaries 
Hosea Stout
William Clayton
Mary Goble Pay
Priddy Meeks
Joseph Smith Black

Discourses 
Joseph Smith Jr.
Brigham Young
Orson Pratt
J. Golden Kimball
B. H. Roberts
Gordon B. Hinckley

The Essay 
Orson F. Whitney
William Mulder
Parley A. Christensen
Robert K. Thomas
Hugh Nibley
Truman G. Madsen
Edward Geary

Nineteenth-Century Poetry 
William W. Phelps
Joseph Smith Jr.
John Lyon
Joel H. Johnson
Eliza R. Snow
Parley P. Pratt
Cyrus H. Wheelock
William Clayton
John Jaques
Charles W. Penrose
Richard Smyth
Ina Coolbrith
Augusta Joyce Crocheron
Joseph L. Townsend
Orson F. Whitney
Josephine Spencer

Twentieth-Century Poetry 
S. Dilworth Young
Vesta Pierce Crawford
Christie Lund Coles
Veneta Leatham Nielsen
Arthur Henry King
Edward L. Hart
Marden J. Clark
Lael W. Hill
May Swenson
Clinton F. Larson
Max Golightly
R. Paul Cracroft
Emma Lou Thayne
John Sterling Harris
David L. Wright
Thomas Asplund
Harrison Davis
Nolyn Hardy
Marilyn McMeen Miller
Robert A. Christmas
Carol Lynn Pearson
Charis Southwell
Clifton Holt Jolley
Dennis Drake
Dennis Marden Clark
Helen Walker Jones
Linda Sillitoe
Ann Doty
Naomi W. Randall

Fiction 
Parley P. Pratt
Josephine Spencer
Nephi Anderson
Virginia Sorensen
Eileen G. Kump
Douglas H. Thayer
Donald R. Marshall

The Novel 
Nephi Anderson
Vardis Fisher
Maurine Whipple

Drama 
Clinton F. Larson
Martin Kelly

Notes

References

External links
Archive.org's online text of A Believing People

1974 books
Mormon literature